Nicocles rufus is a species of robber flies (insects in the family Asilidae).

References

Asilidae
Articles created by Qbugbot
Taxa named by Samuel Wendell Williston
Insects described in 1883